Thomas H. Grey (birth unknown – 3 January 1915) was a Welsh rugby union and professional rugby league footballer who played in the 1900s and 1910s.

Playing career

International honours
Tommy Grey won 3 caps for Wales (RL) in 1911–1912 while at Huddersfield.

County Cup Final appearances
Tommy Grey played  in Huddersfield's 2–8 defeat by Wakefield Trinity in the 1910 Yorkshire County Cup Final during the 1910–11 season at Headingley Rugby Stadium, Leeds on Saturday 3 December 1910, and played , and scored a try and 2-goals in the 22–10 victory over Hull Kingston Rovers in the 1911 Yorkshire County Cup Final during the 1911–12 season at Belle Vue, Wakefield on Saturday 25 November 1911.

County Cup Final appearances
Tommy Grey was transferred from Halifax to Huddersfield on 22 December 1909.

References

External links
 (archived by web.archive.org) Team – Past Players – G at swansearfc.co.uk
 (archived by web.archive.org) Statistics at swansearfc.co.uk

1915 deaths
Footballers who switched code
Halifax R.L.F.C. players
Huddersfield Giants players
Place of birth missing
Place of death missing
Rugby league five-eighths
Rugby league halfbacks
Rugby union halfbacks
Swansea RFC players
Wales national rugby league team players
Welsh rugby league players
Welsh rugby union players
Year of birth missing